Gamba or Ganba is a small town in the Mayo-Kebbi Ouest Region of southwestern Chad. Elephant poaching in the area is a problem and of the worst massacres took place in 14-15 March 2013 when 89 elephants, including 33 pregnant females and 15 calves, were slaughtered by poachers near the town.

References

Populated places in Chad
Mayo-Kebbi Ouest Region